Mohammed al-Makki al-Nasiri (1906–1994) was a Moroccan religious scholar and nationalist politician active in the 1930s and 1940s. He was a member of the "Comité d'action marocaine" in 1934 and the founder of the "Hizb al-Wahda al-Magribiyya" (The Party of Moroccan Unity) in 1937. Mohammed al-Makki al-Nasiri was a member of the royal academy and a personal friend of Mohammed al-Mokhtar Soussi. He was the author of the six volume Al-Taisir fi Ahadith al-Tafsir.

Notes

Moroccan writers
Moroccan politicians
1906 births
1994 deaths
Member of the Academy of the Kingdom of Morocco